Stella Heiß (born 15 January 1993 in Cologne) is a German curler from Garmisch-Partenkirchen. She played lead for Andrea Schöpp when she represented Germany at the 2010 Winter Olympics in Curling. At seventeen years, she was the youngest curler at the Games.

She is the daughter of former German ice hockey goaltender Josef Heiß.

Teammates
2009 Aberdeen European Championships
2010 Vancouver Olympic Games
2010 Ford World Women's Curling Championship

Andrea Schöpp, Skip

Monika Wagner, Third

Melanie Robillard, Second

Corinna Scholz, Alternate

References

External links

German female curlers
Olympic curlers of Germany
Curlers at the 2010 Winter Olympics
World curling champions
1993 births
Living people
Sportspeople from Cologne
European curling champions
Sportspeople from Garmisch-Partenkirchen